The second season of the Cuban National Series was a display of parity, as three of the four teams were within one game of .500. Tied at the top were Industriales, with the first of many titles, and Oriente, so they played a best-of-three-playoff to decide the title.

Standings

Playoff for the championship (best-of-three)
Industriales - Orientales 2 - 1 games

Notes and references

 (Note - text is printed in a white font on a white background, depending on browser used.)
 Industriales had been called Habana the previous season.

Cuban National Series seasons
Cuban National Series
1962 in Cuban sport
1963 in Cuban sport